Ernst Nagelschmitz (1 May 1902 – 23 May 1987) was a German footballer who played as a midfielder. He made one appearance for the Germany national football team, in a 4–2 win against the Netherlands on 18 April 1926. Two years later he was in the squad for the 1928 Olympics in Amsterdam, but did not play. He spent his club career with Bayern Munich, and was part of the team which won the 1932 German football championship.

References

External links

Bayern München Player Records 1900 to 1945

1902 births
1987 deaths
German footballers
Germany international footballers
Olympic footballers of Germany
Footballers at the 1928 Summer Olympics
FC Bayern Munich footballers
Sportspeople from Budapest
Association football midfielders